William Turner (29 November 1789 – 7 August 1862) was an English painter who specialised in watercolour landscapes. He is often known as William Turner of Oxford or just Turner of Oxford to distinguish him from his contemporary, J. M. W. Turner (known as William). Many of Turner's paintings depicted the countryside around Oxford. One of his best known pictures is a view of the city of Oxford from Hinksey Hill.

In 1898, the Ashmolean Museum in Oxford held a retrospective exhibition of his work. Some of his paintings are still on permanent display at the museum. In 1984, the Oxfordshire County Council presented his work in an exhibition at the Oxfordshire County Museum in Woodstock. His paintings are also held in national and international collections, for example at the Tate Gallery (London, UK), the Metropolitan Museum of Art (New York City, US) and the Dunedin Public Art Gallery (New Zealand).

Life
Turner was born at Black Bourton, Oxfordshire. He was the eldest of three children, and had two younger sisters. His father died in 1791, and he was raised during this early part of his life by his mother. In 1803, he went to live with his uncle, also called William Turner. Initially they lived in Burford but in 1804 moved to the manor house at Shipton-on-Cherwell in Oxfordshire.

Because of his interest in drawing, Turner joined John Varley in London. In 1807, he had his first exhibition at the Royal Academy. He was elected as a full member of the Royal Watercolour Society in 1808, and for the rest of his life participated in their yearly exhibitions.

In 1810, Turner returned to Oxfordshire. He lived in Woodstock until 1811. After that he lived in and around Oxford. In 1824 Turner married Elizabeth Ilott at Shipton-on-Cherwell and lived at London Road, St Clement's. From 1833 onwards, he lived at 16 St John Street in central Oxford.

In 1831, the parish church at Shipton-on-Cherwell was demolished and a Georgian Gothic Revival church designed in a Decorated Gothic style by William Turner was built in its place.

Turner died at his home in St John Street, Oxford in 1862. A blue plaque marks the house where he lived. William and his wife are buried in Holy Cross parish churchyard at Shipton-on-Cherwell. In 1896 a memorial chancel screen was installed in the church, with a brass plaque reading "Erected in memory of William Turner of Oxford, Water Colour Painter and architect of this church."

References

Sources

External links

 Paintings in the Tate Gallery
 Artist search information
 Oxford from Hinksey Hill by William Turner
 View of University Park Looking Towards New College, Oxford by William Turner in the Metropolitan Museum of Art, New York City

1789 births
1862 deaths
19th-century English painters
People from West Oxfordshire District
Artists from Oxfordshire
English male painters
English watercolourists
English landscape painters
Culture in Oxford
19th-century English male artists
Burials in Oxfordshire